Philosophy of eating is a concept of food production and nutritional philosophy that matches the source and result of health together.

The core of these points of view is to attach a mental state of mind with the sources of proper agricultural food sources in a balance of harmony in part because the sources have freshness and purity. Modern assertions are that the fresh foods contain vital micronutrients generally lost in most food processing.

Additional issues are brought to light in modern times where advertising along with subtle cues in color or related sensory inputs are masking substandard or even toxic ingredients present.  The masquerade of dyes and organic chemicals from non-food sources become key in the current vernacular of various publications and nutrition movements.

History
As a book The Philosophy of Eating was authored by Albert J. Bellows (1804-1869) in the late 1860s. The author portrayed the concepts in light of science as well as views drawn from religiosity common in the mid to late 1860s era.  So with a biblical fervor as an original direction of inspiration the author then supplies a variety of what was then scientific knowledge to correctly apply that in agriculture to the table in the kitchen. Fresh fruits and grains as those so ordained in the work making up a core of inputs to the meats of the day looked upon in detail most up to that time obtained from the local butcher.

More recent incarnations derived from this are exhibited in raw foodism for people. This manifestation seen in a variety of areas including vegan food preparation and offshoots related. Contemporary revisiting of this in a new updated book continuing is a more secular scientific work by George Davey who published a 2013 book called The Philosophy of Eating Break the Trance. With more up to date scientific analysis than the treatise from Bellows the author describes how mechanisms of discovery, chemical masks and the driving forces beyond that of the earlier works in the topic.

Experiences

Philosophy extends from the scientific observation to how we as people treat our animals versus ourselves in dietary habits from youth through to adulthood.

Reviving the lost art of nourishing ourselves  blogged about in part to illustrate this as a proper approach.

Though cited in The Philosophy of Eating Break the Trance, health philosophy of eating like our paleolithic ancestors is found in a variety directions including mineral intake.

Contrast

Processed foods get celebration along with trepidation in newer periodicals in 2013. Scientific American and Wired devote entire issues to food content and philosophy of nutrition.

Particularly, the scientific basis is now better understood and psychological remediation or behavior patterns are more amenable to that of a reader in modern times contrasted with processed food celebration by. The continued strength of industrialized food troubles some people though.

Notes and references

External links
 The Philosophy of Eating. by Albert J. Bellows, M.D. (Page, Facebook)
 The Philosophy of Eating. by Albert J. Bellows, M.D. (E-book first edition for free, Google Play Store)
 The Philosophy of Eating. by Albert J. Bellows, M.D. (E-book 1868 edition)
 The Philosophy of Eating. by Albert J. Bellows, M.D. (University of Michigan scanned 2005 edition)
 The Philosophy of Eating. by Albert J. Bellows, M.D. (Book and Kindle, Amazon)
 The Philosophy of Eating Break the Trance. by George Davey, updated 2013 new release. (book and Kindle, Amazon)
 Food that Nourishes, the real food revolution (blog, background with recipes)
 Food that Nourishes, the real food revolution (blog, background with recipes)
 Wired Magazine, Food Issue (issue talking about science and the wonders of processed foods)
 Scientific American, September 2013, The Food Issue (issue devoted to food and historical behaviors)

Food and drink culture
Eating behaviors of humans
Eating
Philosophy articles needing attention
Wikipedia:Pages needing attention/Food and drink